Love Is the Power of Women is a 1924 German silent drama film directed by Erich Engel and Georg Bluen and starring Fern Andra, Henri Peters-Arnolds, and Fred Immler.

The film's sets were designed by the art director Bernhard Schwidewski and Oscar Friedrich Werndorff.

Cast

References

Bibliography

External links

1924 films
Films of the Weimar Republic
Films directed by Erich Engel
German silent feature films
German black-and-white films
1924 drama films
German drama films
Circus films
Silent drama films
1920s German films